Yannick Adde (born 8 September 1969) is a French sailor. He competed in the 1992 Summer Olympics.

References

External links 
 
 
 
 

1969 births
Living people
Sailors at the 1992 Summer Olympics – Star
French male sailors (sport)
Olympic sailors of France
20th-century French people